James Boyle (born 1982), better known as Breakage, is a British electronic producer and DJ. He is currently signed to the Digital Soundboy label.

Discography

Albums

EPs
 Breakage & Threshold (Reinforced Records, 2002)
 Back Off (Reinforced Records, 2001)
 The Break Age (Reinforced Records, 2002)
 Hinds Sight (Bassbin, 2007)
 Foundation Promo EP (Digital Soundboy, 2010)

Singles

Other songs
 2004: "Plum Fairy" (Breakage)
 2005: "Staggered Dub" (Breakage)
 2006: "Drowning / The 9th Hand" (Breakage)
 2006: "Blue Mountain" (Breakage)
 2007: "Clarendon/The Shroud" (Breakage)
 2008: "Cooper" (Breakage) (12" Vinyl)
 2008: "Callahan/Untitled" (Breakage)
 2009: "Together (Breakage|David Rodigan)/Rain" (Breakage)
 2009: "Futurist (Instra:mental) / Late Night" (Breakage)
 2011: "Trance / Comatose / Aw Yea
 2011: "Panic Room/Circumference" (Breakage)

References

External links
 
 BBC review of This Too Shall Pass , bbc.co.uk; accessed 30 August 2017.

English people of Irish descent
English electronic musicians
English record producers
Electronic dance music DJs
DJs from London
Dubstep musicians
Living people
Reinforced Records artists
Place of birth missing (living people)
Year of birth missing (living people)
Planet Mu artists